Lakshmi Nandan Bora (15 June 1932 – 3 June 2021) was an Indian novelist and short story writer in the Assamese language, known for over 60 books he has authored, including award winning novels, Patal Bhairavi and Kayakalpa. A recipient of Sahitya Academy Award and Saraswati Samman, Bora was honoured by the Government of India in 2015 with Padma Shri, the fourth highest Indian civilian award. He died on 3 June 2021 from complications caused by COVID-19.

Biography

Lakshmi Nandan Bora was born on 15 June 1932 at Hatichung of Kudijah village, a small hamlet in Nagaon district in the Northeast Indian state of Assam to Phuleswar Bora and Phuleswari as the youngest of their five children. His parents died while he was in his teens and he was brought up by his eldest brother, Kamal Chandra Bora. He did his schooling at Nagaon High School, graduated in Physics (BSc) from Cotton College State University, Guwahati and secured his master's degree (MSc) from Presidency College, Kolkata. He pursued doctoral studies in meteorology at Andhra University from where he secured a PhD, the first person to be awarded a doctoral degree in meteorology by the university. For most of his career he worked at Assam Agricultural University, Jorhat as a faculty member and stayed with the institution till his retirement as a professor and the head of the department of physics and agrometeorology in 1992. He has also served as a visiting professor at the Johannes Gutenberg University for two terms. Bora married Madhuri in 1961 and the couple has one daughter Seuji and two sons Tridib Nandan and Swaroop Nandan. The family lives in Ganeshguri, a satellite town of Guwahati, Assam. Seuji Bora Neog is a Professor of Genetics and Plantbreeding at Assam Agricultural University, Jorhat, Tridib Nandan Bora is a Senior State Government Official while the youngest son Swaroop Nandan is a Professor of Mathematics at Indian Institute of Technology Guwahati. Lakshmi Nandan Borah died on 3 June 2021 at the age of 88.

Literary and social career

Bora wrote his first short story, Bhaona, in 1954, which was published in Assamese magazine, Ramdhenu. His first book, Dristirupa was published in 1958 and the next one, Nishar Purabhi in 1962. He published his first novel, Gonga Silonir Pakhi, in 1963, which is reported to have earned critical acclaim, has been translated into 11 languages and was made into a film, under the same name, by Padum Baruah in 1976. The succeeding years saw him active in the political milieu of Assam and was arrested once, in 1981, under the National Security Act. His novel, Akou Saraighat, written during this time and published in 1980, reflects his political leanings to a certain measure. He also founded a weekly, Rangpur, and stayed as its editor till 1996 when he resigned from the post, reportedly due to ideological differences with the owner of the publication.

Two more novels, Matit Meghar Chaan (1970) and Bishesh Eraati (1979) and a short story anthology, Sehi Anuraga (1983) followed before he published his novel, Patal Bhairavi in 1986 which won the Sahitya Academy Award in 1988. Two novels were published next, Kal Dingare Pal in 1988 and Matsya Kanya in 1995 followed by Preyashi (1996 - short story anthology), Jaa Keri Naahike Upaam and Sehi Gunanidhi (1997 - novel), the latter two inspired by the lives of Sankardev and his disciple, Madhavdev, renowned Assamese saint-scholars. In 2008, he published Kayakalpa, which won the Saraswati Samman from K. K. Birla Foundation. The work has since been translated into 22 Indian languages as well as into English by Biman Arandhara.

Lakshmi Nandan Bora has written a number of plays and books on agriculture and environment, taking his publications to a total of 60 books, composed of twenty nine novels and twenty six short story anthologies. His short stories, 75 selected ones, have been compiled under the name, Lakshminandan Borar Charita Dasakar Galpa Samagra. His published autobiography Kal Balukat Khoj was also serialized in the Assamese fortnightly, Prantik. His other current projects are two books, one on Hem Chandra Baruah, renowned lexicographer and social reformer and the other, on Lakshminath Bezbaroa, a known Assamese literary figure.

He has served as the president of Assam Sahitya Sabha (1996–97) and as a member of the Planning Commission of Assam. He has also been the chairman of the Assam Pollution Control Board during the period 1997 - 2003 and served as the editor of Goriyoshi, an Assamese monthly literary magazine.

Bibliography
Some of the selected publications of Bora are:

Sei Surey Utola[1960] --Story
Kashiyolir Kuwoli[1961]--Story
Gopon Godhuli[1961]--Story
Gouri Ruupok[1961]--Story
Mon Mati Megh[1962]--Story
Ashiin Koina[1963]--Story
Aei Roop Aei Chanda[1963]--Story
Dahan Dulori[1965]--Story
Kothin Maya[1966]--Story
Debotar Byadhi[1966]--Story
Majot Trisharey Noi[1967--Story
Byotikrom[1976]--Story
Nishiddha Chetona[1976]--Story
Arabarir Lecheri[1983]--Story
Doostor Karagar[2002]--Story
Preyoshi[1993]--Anthology
Mon Birikhor Jokh[2001]--Story
Mukta Poorush[2002]--Story
Mon Mati Piriti[1962]--Story
Aalakh Khorikajai[2006]--Story
Basonti Bashona[2017]--Story
Saa Jueir Pohorot[1966]--Novel
Shikhar Surobhi[1968]--Novel
Meghali Doopor[1968]--Novel
Bolookat Bijuli[1969]--Novel
Amtit Meghor Saa[1970]--Novel
Uttor Poorush[1970]--Novel
Poton[1979]--Novel
Radhikaput Aruu Malakhsmi Niketan[1982]--Novel
Ghatok Polatok[1985]--Novel
Protirodh[1987]--Novel
Biponna Bismoi[1988]--Novel
Ganeshguri[1988]--Novel
Nayak Adhinayak[1992]--Novel
Hiyat Tirebirai[1993]--Novel
Meghot Madol Baje[1999]--Novel
Shoturongo[2003]--Novel
Tejoshini[2003]--Novel
Goti Moti Bhokoti[2005]--Novel
Shehi Shobyoshashi[2014]--Novel
Pochimor Pom Khedi[1991]--Travelogue
Joraloga Germany[1993]--Travelogue
Shimar Poridhi Bhangi[1997]--Travelogue
Shipurir Achoni[1961]--Drama
Akanko Jugol[1972]--Drama
Swamy Bibekananda[1997]--Biography
Sonkordev:Ati Mohajibon[1999]--Biography
Mahapoorush Madhabdeb[1999]--Biography
Kal Bolukat Khoj[2010]--Autobiography

 Dristirupa (1958) - anthology
 Nishar Purabi (1962) - anthology
 Gonga Silonir Pakhi (1963) - novel
 Aabesh Indrajal (1967) - anthology
 Matit Meghar Chaan (1970) - anthology
 Bishesh Eraati (1979) - novel
 Akou Saraighat (1980) - novel
 Jaa Keri Naahike Upaam
 Sehi Anuraga (1983) - anthology
 Patal Bhairavi (1986) - novel
 Kal Dingarare Pal (1988) - novel
 Matsya Kanya (1995) - novel
 Preyashi (1996) - anthology
 Sehi Gunanidhi (1997) - novel
 Ganga Cheel Ke Pankh (2003) - novel
 Kayakalpa (2008) - novel
 Lakshminandan Borar Charita Dasakar Galpa Samagra — short story anthology

Awards and recognitions
Bora received the Sahitya Academy Award in 1988 for his novel, Patal Bhairavi and the Assam Valley Literary Award in 2004. His novel, Kayakalpa fetched him the Saraswati Samman instituted by the K. K. Birla Foundation in 2008 and in 2012, Assam Publication Board honoured him with the Lifetime Achievement Award. The Government of India included him for the Republic Day honours list, in 2015, for the civilian honour of Padma Shri.

See also

 Gonga Silonir Pakhi
 Assam Agricultural University
 Goriyoshi
 Hem Chandra Baruah
 Lakshminath Bezbaroa
 Sankardev
 Madhavdev

References

Further reading

External links
 

Recipients of the Padma Shri in literature & education
1932 births
2021 deaths
People from Nagaon district
Novelists from Assam
Indian male novelists
Indian male short story writers
Recipients of the Sahitya Akademi Award in Assamese
Recipients of the Saraswati Samman Award
Cotton College, Guwahati alumni
Andhra University alumni
20th-century Indian short story writers
20th-century Indian novelists
20th-century Indian male writers
Deaths from the COVID-19 pandemic in India